Tye White is an American actor, known for his role as Kevin Satterlee in the Oprah Winfrey Network drama series, Greenleaf (2016—18).

Life and career
White is African American, born in Detroit, Michigan. He attended Brother Rice High School (Michigan) and studied at the University of Michigan. He first appeared on The Amazing Race 13 with his then-girlfriend Aja Benton and they lasted 5 legs before being eliminated.

His first major role was in the VH1 television film Drumline: A New Beat in 2014. He has a recurring role as Aiden Hanna, son of Sam Hanna (played by LL Cool J ) in the CBS procedural series NCIS: Los Angeles and in 2016 appeared in the secondary role as Jason Simpson, O. J. Simpson's son, in the FX series The People v. O. J. Simpson: American Crime Story.

In 2015, White was cast in a series regular role in the Oprah Winfrey Network drama series, Greenleaf. He plays Kevin Satterlee, Charity Greenleaf-Satterlee's (played by Deborah Joy Winans) husband, who is gay. The series also stars Lynn Whitfield, Keith David, Merle Dandridge, and Kim Hawthorne. He left the series in 2018. In 2021, White was cast in the NBC comedy series American Auto opposite Ana Gasteyer.

Filmography

Film

Television

Video games

References

External links 
 

Living people
African-American male actors
American male television actors
University of Michigan alumni
21st-century American male actors
Year of birth missing (living people)
21st-century African-American people